Haplogroup JT is a human mitochondrial DNA (mtDNA) haplogroup.

Origin
Haplogroup JT is descended from the macro-haplogroup R. It is the ancestral clade to the mitochondrial haplogroups J and T.

JT (predominantly J) was found among the ancient Etruscans. The haplogroup has also been found among Iberomaurusian specimens dating from the Epipaleolithic at the Taforalt prehistoric site. One ancient individual carried a haplotype, which correlates with either the JT clade or the haplogroup H subclade H14b1 (1/9; 11%).

Subclades

Tree
This phylogenetic tree of haplogroup JT subclades is based on the paper by Mannis van Oven and Manfred Kayser Updated comprehensive phylogenetic tree of global human mitochondrial DNA variation and subsequent published research.

R2'JT
JT
J
T

Health
Maternally inherited ancient mtDNA variants have clear impact on the presentation of disease in a modern society. Superhaplogroup JT is an example of reduced risk of Parkinson's disease And mitochondrial and mtDNa alterations continue to be promising disease biomarkers.

See also 
Genealogical DNA test
Genetic genealogy
Human mitochondrial genetics
Population genetics

References

External links
General
Ian Logan's Mitochondrial DNA Site
Mannis van Oven's Phylotree

JT